Kara Rud may refer to:
 Kara Rud, Ardabil
 Kara Rud, Gilan